John Lorne Parkin (October 2, 1922 – December 2, 1992) was a Canadian football player who played for the Toronto Argonauts. He won the Grey Cup with them in 1950 and 1952. He was also a sergeant for the Toronto Police Service.

References

1922 births
1992 deaths
Players of Canadian football from Ontario
Canadian football people from Toronto
Toronto Argonauts players